Mátyás Erdély (born 17 September 1976) is a Hungarian cinematographer. Among his best-known films is the 2015 Hungarian film Son of Saul, which won the award for Best Foreign Language Film at the 88th Academy Awards. Erdély won the Bronze Frog at Camerimage and the Golden Camera 300 at the Manaki Brothers Film Festival for his cinematography on the film. His other work includes Delta (2008), Tender Son: The Frankenstein Project (2010), Miss Bala (2011), The Quiet Ones (2014) and James White (2015).

Filmography
 Delta (2008)
 Tender Son: The Frankenstein Project (2010)
 Miss Bala (2011)
 The Woman Who Brushed Off Her Tears (2012) 
 Kenau (2014)  
 The Quiet Ones (2014)
 James White (2015)
 Son of Saul (2015)
 Sunset (2018) 
 The Nest (2020) 
 Foe (TBA) 
 The Iron Claw (TBA)

References

External links
 

1976 births
Living people
Hungarian cinematographers